George Wesley Hauser (February 24, 1893 – November 8, 1968) was an American football player and coach.  He served as the head football coach at Colgate University from 1926 until 1927 and at the University of Minnesota from 1942 to 1944, compiling a career coaching record of 24–15–6.   His record of Colgate was 9–4–5.  His overall record at Minnesota was 15–11–1 (.574) and his conference record was 8–8–1.  Hauser played college football at Minnesota as a tackle from 1915 to 1917. He died on November 8, 1968, in Seattle, Washington, following a long illness.

Head coaching record

References

External links
 

1893 births
1968 deaths
All-American college football players
American football tackles
Colgate Raiders football coaches
Iowa State Cyclones football coaches
Minnesota Golden Gophers football coaches
Minnesota Golden Gophers football players
Ohio State Buckeyes football coaches
People from Cedar Rapids, Iowa
Sportspeople from Council Bluffs, Iowa
Players of American football from Iowa